"Let There Be Love" is a song by Scottish rock band Simple Minds and first single from their ninth studio album, Real Life (1991). The song was written by Charlie Burchill and Jim Kerr and released by Virgin Records on 11 March 1991. The song became an international hit, reaching the top 10 in Ireland, the Netherlands, Sweden, Switzerland, and the United Kingdom. It was the most successful in Italy, where it peaked at number one. The official music video for the song was directed by Andy Morahan.

Track listings
7-inch and cassette single
 "Let There Be Love" (7-inch mix) – 4:44
 "Goodnight" – 3:10

12-inch single
 "Let There Be Love" (extended mix) – 8:15
 "Good Night" – 3:10
 "Let There Be Love" (7-inch mix) – 4:44
 "Alive and Kicking" (live, Verona 1989) – 3:51

CD single
 "Let There Be Love" (7-inch mix) – 4:44
 "Good Night" – 3:10
 "Let There Be Love" (extended mix) – 8:15
 "Alive and Kicking" (live, Verona 1989) – 3:51

CD single + collectors box
 "Let There Be Love" (edited album mix) – 4:24
 "Let There Be Love" (extended mix) – 8:15
 "East at Easter" (live, Verona 1989) – 6:12

Personnel
 Written by Burchill & Kerr, except "Alive and Kicking" and "East at Easter" written by Simple Minds
 Mixed by Julian Mendelsohn
 Edited by Moraes, Mendelsohn and Lipson
 "Alive and Kicking" and "East at Easter" recorded Live at L'Arena, Verona 14/15 September 1989 by the Fleetwood Mobile
 Published by Virgin Music Publishers Ltd. except "Alive and Kicking"
 Published by EMI Music Publishing Ltd

Charts

Weekly charts

Year-end charts

References

Simple Minds songs
1991 singles
1991 songs
Music videos directed by Andy Morahan
Number-one singles in Italy
Song recordings produced by Stephen Lipson
Songs written by Charlie Burchill
Songs written by Jim Kerr
Virgin Records singles